The men's doubles tennis competition was one of five tennis events at the 1924 Summer Olympics. There were 76 players from 24 nations, forming 38 pairs. Nations were limited to two pairs (four players) each. The event was won by Americans Francis Hunter and Vincent Richards after five-set matches in both the semifinals and final against French pairs. It was the nation's second victory in the event, second-most behind Great Britain's three wins. Jacques Brugnon and Henri Cochet were the silver medalists, falling to the Americans in the final. Jean Borotra and René Lacoste had met Hunter and Richards in the semifinals, losing to them before winning the bronze-medal match against Jack Condon and Ivie Richardson of South Africa.

Background

This was the seventh appearance of men's doubles tennis. The event has been held at every Summer Olympics where tennis has been on the program: from 1896 to 1924 and then from 1988 to the current program. A demonstration event was held in 1968.

The field for the 1924 doubles tournament was fairly strong by early Olympic standards. The American and French teams were particularly strong, with both pairs from an all-American final at Wimbledon earlier that year (Francis Hunter and Vincent Richards over Watson Washburn and R. Norris Williams) competing at the Games. The Four Musketeers made up the French contingent, with Jacques Brugnon and Henri Cochet one pair and Jean Borotra and René Lacoste the other.

Argentina, Chile, Finland, India, Ireland, Mexico, and Romania each made their debut in the event. Great Britain made its fifth appearance in the event, most of any nation.

Competition format

The competition was a single-elimination tournament with a bronze-medal match. All matches were best-of-five sets. Tiebreaks had not been invented yet.

Schedule

Draw

Finals

Top half

Section 1

Section 2

Bottom half

Section 3

Section 4

References

Sources
 ITF, 2008 Olympic Tennis Event Media Guide

1924
Men's doubles
Men's events at the 1924 Summer Olympics